Fritch is a city in Hutchinson and Moore Counties in the U.S. state of Texas. The population was 2,117 at the 2010 census.  The mayor is Dwight Kirksey.

History

1992 tornado
On June 27, 1992, a mile-wide, multi-vortex F4 tornado struck the Fritch area, resulting in major damage to the city and 7 injuries, but no loss of life.

2014 wildfire
On May 11, 2014, a fast-moving wildfire in the area began, causing much destruction and loss of homes in the Fritch area, which was evacuated by authorities. Media reported 100 structures destroyed with numerous people in local shelters.

Geography
Fritch is located in the southwest corner of Hutchinson County at the geographic center of the Texas Panhandle region. Fritch sits in an area where the typically flat High Plains are divided into canyons and draws by the Canadian River. The city sits on flat land surrounded by undulating terrain.

Demographics

2020 census

As of the 2020 United States census, there were 1,859 people, 824 households, and 616 families residing in the city.

2000 census
As of the census of 2000,  2,235 people, 886 households, and 679 families resided in the city. The population density was 1,840.9 people per square mile (713.2/km). The 961 housing units averaged 791.5 per square mile (306.6/km). The racial makeup of the city was 95.53% White, 0.09% African American, 1.66% Native American, 0.13% Asian, 1.30% from other races, and 1.30% from two or more races. Hispanics or Latinos of any race were 4.30% of the population.

Of the 886 households, 34.7% had children under the age of 18 living with them, 66.3% were married couples living together, 8.1% had a female householder with no husband present, and 23.3% were not families. About 21.6% of all households were made up of individuals, and 11.7% had someone living alone who was 65 years of age or older. The average household size was 2.52 and the average family size was 2.93.

In the city, the population was distributed as 26.4% under the age of 18, 7.5% from 18 to 24, 25.8% from 25 to 44, 24.0% from 45 to 64, and 16.4% who were 65 years of age or older. The median age was 39 years. For every 100 females, there were 98.1 males. For every 100 females age 18 and over, there were 93.6 males.

The median income for a household in the city was $42,098, and a family was $46,600. Males had a median income of $41,134 versus $21,860 for females. The per capita income for the city was $17,745. None of the population were below the poverty line.

Fritch is primarily a bedroom community, with the majority of citizens commuting to nearby Borger and Amarillo for work. Major employers in the area include Pantex, ConocoPhillips, and Agrium, all located within a short distance of Fritch. Due to its nature as a commuting town, Fritch differs from most small towns in the region, which rely more on agriculture as their economic base. Though several large ranches are adjacent to the town, little to no farming occurs due to the uneven topography, and the town has few agriculture-related services.

Recreation
Fritch is located adjacent to the Lake Meredith National Recreation Area, which offers residents and visitors ample opportunities for outdoor activities including boating, fishing, camping, hiking, and seasonal hunting. The city is home to the Lake Meredith Historical Museum.

Notable people
 Ron White, comedian

Education
Fritch is served by the Sanford-Fritch Independent School District.

Images

References

External links
 City of Fritch official website
 Lake Meredith National Recreation Area

Cities in Hutchinson County, Texas
Cities in Moore County, Texas
Cities in Texas